The Gur Sikh Temple (Gurdwara) of Abbotsford in British Columbia is the oldest existing Sikh temple in North America and a National Historic Site Canada. It is the only Sikh temple outside of India and Pakistan that is designated as national historic site.

While it is the oldest existing Gurdwara in Canada and North America, it is the third-oldest to be built in the country and continent. The oldest Gurdwara in Canada was built by early Sikh-Canadian settlers in Golden, British Columbia in 1905, which would later be destroyed by fire in 1926. Meanwhile, the second-oldest Gurdwara to be built in Canada opened in 1908 in Kitsilano (Vancouver), aimed at serving a growing number of Sikh settlers who worked at nearby sawmills along False Creek at the time, which would later close and be demolished in 1970, with the temple society relocating to the newly built Gurdwara on Ross Street, in South Vancouver.

History

The first Sikh pioneers came to the Abbotsford area in 1905 and originally worked on farms and in the lumber industry. First plans to build a temple were made in 1908. After a property situated on a hill was acquired the settlers carried lumber from a local mill on their backs up a hill to construct the gurdwara. When the Gurdwara opened on February 26, 1911 Sikhs and non-Sikhs from across British Columbia attended the ceremony and a local newspaper reported on the event. The temple was a two floor building that from the outside looked like the contemporary wood houses often seen in local frontier towns. Features and decoration typical for Sikh architecture and design were only used in the interior. The first floor contains the Langar and common dining room for the community, and the second floor contains the prayer hall. The building was extended twice in 1932 and in the 1960s. Until 1975 the Gurdwara belonged to the Khalsa Diwan Society Vancouver (founded in 1905), then it was transferred to the Khalsa Diwan Society Abbotsford, who wished for a greater autonomy. In 1983, a new, much larger, temple with a completely different architectural style was built on the opposite side of the road. The old temple was designated a National Historic Site in 2002, with the designated declared by prime minister Jean Chretien at a ceremony on July 26 of 2002. In 2007, the temple reopened after renovation.  For 2011, a small museum in the basement was planned in connection with the temple's 100 years anniversary. To mark the centennial (1911-2011) of Gur Sikh Temple, Prime Minister Stephen Harper inaugurated the Sikh Heritage Museum in the ground floor of the Temple.

On May 19, 2017 Prime Minister Justin Trudeau visited the Canada 150 exhibit at Sikh Heritage Museum.

Notes

See also
Sikhism in Canada

References
Rochelle Baker: Abbotsford's Gur Sikh Temple celebrates 100 years . In Abbotsford Times of 2010-12-13
Canada's 100-Year-Old Temple - report on Al Jazeera English (video,2:10 min.)
Satwinder Bains: Gur Sikh Temple at canadiansikhheritage.ca
Oldest Sikh temple reopens. South Fraser Way was transformed into a sea of saris yesterday. at canada.com on 2007-4-2

External links

1911 Gurdwara: A National Historic Site - some basic information and pictures on a website of the MSA Museum Society
Sikh Temples And Societies at abbotsfordtoday.com on 2009-4-1
Government Supports Grant to Historic Temple
,  - images on Flickr
Abbotsford Sikh Gurdwara Launches Centennial Anniversary With Special Proclamation: 2011 Year of the Gurdwara
Douglas Todd: B.C. Sikhs have had a long, hard road for 100 years. Website of The Vancouver Sun, 2011-1-10

Buildings and structures in Abbotsford, British Columbia
Gurdwaras in Canada
Sikh places
National Historic Sites in British Columbia
Religious buildings and structures in British Columbia
Religious buildings and structures on the National Historic Sites of Canada register
1908 establishments in British Columbia